The 1968 Cork Senior Hurling Championship was the 80th staging of the Cork Senior Hurling Championship since its establishment by the Cork County Board in 1887. The championship began on 28 April 1968 and ended on 13 September 1968.

Glen Rovers were the defending champions, however, they withdrew from the championship at the semi-final stage.

On 13 September 1968, St. Finbarr's won the championship following a 5-9 to 1-19 defeat of Imokilly in the final. This was their 17th championship title overall and their first in three championship seasons.

Charlie McCarthy from the St. Finbarr's club was the championship's top scorer with 5-21.

Team changes

To Championship

Promoted from the Cork Intermediate Hurling Championship
 Ballincollig

Results

First round

Quarter-finals

Semi-finals

Final

Championship statistics

Top scorers

Top scorer overall

Top scorers in a single game

Miscellaneous

 On 15 August 1968, Glen Rovers withdrew from the championship in protest over the expulsion of Glen player Andrew O'Flynn from the Gaelic Athletic Association and the suspension of three other Glen players as a result of an investigation into incidents in the Glen Rovers-University College Cork quarter-final.
 Gerald McCarthy from the St. Finbarr's club got married on the day before the county final and delayed his honeymoon until immediately after the game.
 Imokilly qualify for the final for the first time since 1949

References

Cork Senior Hurling Championship
Cork Senior Hurling Championship